is Japanese actress and former singer. She is a former member of the Japanese idol girl group AKB48. She was a member of AKB48's Team B.

Career 
Oshima passed AKB48's 13th generation auditions on 9 September 2011. Her debut was on 8 December 2011 at AKB48's 6th anniversary stage performance. In August 2012, she was promoted to Team A. She started activities as a Team A member in November 2012. In February 2014, during the AKB48 Group Shuffle, it was announced Oshima would be transferred to Team B.

In the group's general elections in 2014, Oshima ranked for the first time at 80th position. Her first senbatsu single was Kibouteki Refrain, and she was the first 13th generation member to be selected for senbatsu.

On March 23, 2017 during AKB48 Team B's concert, it was announced that Ryoka would graduate from AKB48 soon. On 8 June 2017, Oshima graduated from AKB48.

Discography

AKB48 singles

Appearances

Stage units
AKB48 Kenkyuusei Stage "RESET"
 
Team A Waiting Stage
 
 
 
AKB48 Team B 3rd Stage  (Revival)

TV variety
  (2012–2016 )
  (2012–2016 )
  (2012–2016 )
 AKBingo! (2013–2016 )

TV dramas
  (2014)
  (2015), Kusogaki (Team Hinabe)
  (2015), Kusogaki (Team Hinabe)
  Ep.12 – Grandma (2015), Moe
  (2016), Kusogaki (Ankou)
  Ep.11 & 12 (2019), Maria

Musicals
 AKB49 Stage Play (2014)

References

External links
 AKB48 Official Profile
 Ryoka Oshima on Google+

1998 births
Living people
Japanese idols
Japanese women pop singers
People from Kanagawa Prefecture
Musicians from Kanagawa Prefecture
AKB48 members
21st-century Japanese women singers
21st-century Japanese singers